Samaritas, formerly Lutheran Social Services of Michigan, is a 501(c)(3) non-profit, human services organization that serves the entire Lower Peninsula of Michigan with more than 70 programs sites, including adoption, a community center, foster care, family preservation, independent, assisted living and rehabilitation centers for seniors, skilled nursing centers, refugee resettlement and employment services, subsidized housing, and services for the homeless and developmentally disabled.  It is the largest faith-based non-profit human service organization in Michigan, but provides help for all people in need regardless of religious affiliation, age, sexual orientation or national origin.
Samaritas is the largest private foster care agency in Michigan, and also is the largest provider of refugee services in Michigan and the fourth largest in the United States.

History 

Samaritas has its roots in the congregational outreach efforts of Lutheran immigrants from Germany and Scandinavia who settled in Detroit at the end of the 19th century.  In 1909, the Missionsbund (Mission Federation) was formed.  In 1934, the Lutheran Inner Mission League of Greater Detroit was incorporated.  The following year, the name was changed to The Lutheran Charities. The organization's focus included child welfare, services for the elderly, and a settlement house.  The Lutheran Charities merged with a similar group in 1959 and was reborn as Samaritas to offer programs statewide across the Lower Peninsula. The organization began its work in West Michigan in 1965 when it acquired The Lutheran Old Folks Home in downtown Grand Rapids, renamed Luther Home (and MapleCreek in 2007).

Affiliations 

Samaritas is a social ministry organization member of Lutheran Services in America and a partner of the Evangelical Lutheran Church in America.  Though not owned by the ELCA, Samaritas is governed by a Board of Directors whose members represent parishes in the ELCA's Southeast Michigan Synod and North/West Lower Michigan Synod.

Mission 
Serving people as an expression of the love of Christ

Vision 
We connect people with families and communities, empower them to live their fullest life possible, and create a ripple effect of transformation..

Technical Services 
Working in partnership with other non-profit associations in Michigan by providing hardware, network and programming services.

References

External links 
Samaritas
 LSA Member Organizations
 North/West Lower Michigan Synod ELCA
 Southeast Michigan Synod ELCA

Lutheran organizations
Organizations based in Detroit
Organizations established in 1909
Charities based in Michigan
Evangelical Lutheran Church in America